Old Womans Creek is a stream in the U.S. state of Iowa. It is a tributary to Old Mans Creek.

According to tradition, Old Womans Creek was named for its use as a remote hiding spot for Native American women during tribal conflicts.

References

Rivers of Johnson County, Iowa
Rivers of Iowa